Gordon Harris may refer to:

 Gordon Harris (footballer, born 1940) (1940–2014), English footballer
 Gordon Harris (footballer, born 1945), Scottish footballer
 Gordon Harris (actor) (1918–1965), English actor
 Gordon Harris (urban planner), Canadian urban planner
 Gordon Harris (Australian cricketer) (1897-1974), Australian cricketer
 Gordon Harris (English cricketer) (born 1964), former English cricketer
 Gordon Harris (Canadian politician)